Aleksei Sergeyevich Lyubushkin (born 25 January 1990) is a former Russian professional football player.

Club career
He made his Russian Football National League debut for FC Torpedo Moscow on 8 May 2008 in a game against FC Dynamo Bryansk.

External links
 
 Career summary by sportbox.ru
 

1990 births
Living people
Russian footballers
Association football defenders
FC Torpedo Moscow players
FC Academia Chișinău players
FC Veris Chișinău players
Moldovan Super Liga players
Russian expatriate footballers
Expatriate footballers in Moldova
FC Sportakademklub Moscow players